Charles Cook Cushing (December 8 1905-1982) was an American composer, band director, and professor of music.

Biography
Charles Cushing, a native Californian, studied at the University of California, Berkeley.  Encouraged by visiting French Composer Charles Koechlin during the summers of 1928 and 1929, he received his Bachelor's degree in 1928 and Master's in 1929.  He won the George Ladd Prix de Paris prize, allowing him to study with Nadia Boulanger at the École Normale de Musique in Paris for two years.

Began teaching music at the University of California, Berkeley in 1931.  Served as the Director of the Cal Band in from 1934 to 1952.  Taught as a full professor from 1948 through 1968.

Friend of Igor Stravinsky.  Notable students include Jonathan Elkus, Roger Nixon and Loren Rush.

Selected works
 Angel Camp for Band (1952)
 Cereus, Poem for Orchestra (1959)
 Divertimento for String Orchestra
 Piece for Clarinet and Piano  
 Pas de Deux
 Petite Suite for symphonic Band (Composer: Béla Bartók Arranger: Charles Cushing)

External links
California Digital Library
The University of California Marching Band

American male composers
1905 births
1982 deaths
Musicians from California
University of California, Berkeley alumni
University of California, Berkeley College of Letters and Science faculty
Place of birth missing
20th-century American composers
20th-century American male musicians